Sozak, or Sozaq (Sozaq, سوزاق, also Russified Suzak), is a village in Sozak District, South Kazakhstan Region, Kazakhstan.

History
Sozaq was the capital of the Kazakh Khanate from c. 1465-1469. In February 1930, there was an anti-Soviet insurgency in the village, following which the administrative center of the district was transferred to the village of Sholakkorgan.

References

Populated places in Turkistan Region